Special Council of the USSR NKVD (Особое совещание при НКВД СССР, ОСО) was created by the same decree of Sovnarkom of July 10, 1934 that introduced the NKVD itself. By the decree, the Special Council was endowed with the rights to apply punishments "by administrative means," i.e., without trial. In other words, the term "by administrative means" actually refers to extrajudicial punishment.

The following types of punishment were put at the disposal of the Special Council by this decree: banishment (высылка) (from the place of residence), exile (ссылка) (to remote regions), corrective labor camps up to five years and deportation (высылка) from the USSR. 

In 1937 during the Great Purge the Special Council was allowed to sentence to imprisonment up to eight years. In November 1941 after the beginning of the war with Germany the Special Council was allowed to sentence to imprisonment up to 25 years or to death. After the end of the war the Special Council was not allowed to sentence to death, the maximum available punishment was 25 years of imprisonment.

When NKVD was renamed, the Special Council remained within the corresponding organization, e.g., as Special Council of MGB, etc.

It was abolished in September 1953, shortly after the death of Joseph Stalin.

See also
NKVD troika

References

NKVD